Vladimir Grigoryevich Zakharov (October 18, 1901 – July 13, 1956), was a Soviet and Russian composer and choir conductor. He was born near Donetsk in the present-day Ukraine. From 1912 to 1921 he lived in the city of Taganrog, where he studied at the Boys Gymnasium and attended music classes by Valerian Molla at the Taganrog School for Music. He graduated from the Rostov Conservatory in 1927. His long-term connection with the Pyatnitsky Choir (since 1932) gave him many chances composing choral music. Most of his songs are in peasant way. Even sometime later, no one can tell whether one of his famous song was a composition or an arrangement of a folk piece.

In the 1920s, he and other composers formed the Russian Association of Proletarian Musicians (RAPM) and became an active member of this association.

Vladimir Zakharov was awarded the title of the People's Artist of the USSR in 1944, and received three Stalin Prizes in 1942, 1946 and 1952. He joined the Communist Party in 1944.

In 1948 he was appointed one of the Principal Secretaries of Union of Soviet Composers. He was an active figure in the persecution on "formalist" composers. Those who were denounced by him include Dmitri Shostakovich, Sergei Prokofiev, Aram Khachaturian, Nikolai Myaskovsky, and Vano Muradeli.

References

1901 births
1956 deaths
20th-century classical musicians
20th-century composers
20th-century Russian conductors (music)
20th-century Russian male musicians
People from Bakhmutsky Uyezd
Communist Party of the Soviet Union members
People's Artists of the USSR
Stalin Prize winners
Recipients of the Order of Lenin
Recipients of the Order of the Red Banner of Labour
Russian choral conductors
Russian male classical composers
Russian male conductors (music)
Soviet conductors (music)
Soviet male classical composers
Burials at Novodevichy Cemetery